Joshua Sweeney (born June 6, 1987) is an American gold medal ice sled hockey player and Purple Heart recipient who competed in 2014 Winter Paralympics in Sochi, Russia.

Early life
Sweeney's passion for hockey began at an early age, as he played ice hockey during middle school & competed in his high school team. A graduate of Ironwood High School's class of 2005, he shortly enlisted in the United States Marine Corps.

Military life
In September 2009, Sergeant Sweeney was deployed to Afghanistan for his second deployment as a scout sniper to Nowzad, Afghanistan.

On October 28, 2009, while on patrol duty, Sgt. Sweeney was injured when he stepped on an IED. The blast severed both his legs & caused injury to his left hand & arm. He had to wait 2 hours to be evacuated.

Paralympic hockey career
In 2014, Sweeney joined Paralympic sled hockey team and lost 2–1 to the Russians. Couple of days later, he scored the only goal with which his team won a gold medal in a final against the same country. A native of Arizona, he is divorced and lives in Idaho. He received a new specially adapted home from the Homes For Our Troops non-profit group in November 2014.

References

External links 
 
 

1987 births
Living people
American sledge hockey players
Paralympic gold medalists for the United States
Ice sledge hockey players at the 2014 Winter Paralympics
Medalists at the 2014 Winter Paralympics
Sportspeople from Arizona
United States Marines
United States Marine Corps personnel of the Iraq War
United States Marine Corps personnel of the War in Afghanistan (2001–2021)
Paralympic medalists in sledge hockey
Paralympic sledge hockey players of the United States